Peter II (died 1241) was the Judge of Arborea from 1221 to his death. He was also Peter IV, Viscount of Bas. He was "pious and submissive to the church" and his extensive "donations of privileges and judicial lands impoverished his state of glory."

Peter's father, Hugh I, of the Bas family, died in 1211 while Peter was still a child. By treaty, Hugh had shared the throne with Peter I from 1195 and Peter was still living when Hugh died. In 1214, Peter I died, as did William I of Cagliari, his supporter. Peter's successor, Torchitorio IV, laid claim to Peter I's title to Arborea and married William's heiress, Benedetta.

In 1221, Peter began ruling alone. In 1228, he allied with the Visconti of Gallura, then allied with Pisa. He was consequently attacked by William II of Cagliari and Marianus II of Torres. They desired to maintain a condominium in Arborea, but internal fighting allowed Peter to solidify his authority with little opposition.

In 1231, Eldiarda, Peter's regent in Bas (Spain), tried to pass the viscounty to her son Simon I of Palau, who married Güeraua d'Anglesola. In 1241, Peter finally recognised this new viscount and James I of Aragon recognised him too. Peter himself died that year.

In 1222, he married Diana Visconti, sister of Lambert of Gallura, at the insistence of Ubaldo. Later, he remarried to a woman named Sardinia. By her, he was the father of Marianus II.

Notes

Sources
Nowé, Laura Sannia. Dai "lumi" dalla patria Italiana: Cultura letteraria sarda. Mucchi Editore: Modena, 1996.

1241 deaths
Judges (judikes) of Arborea
Year of birth unknown
Viscounts of Bas